Cat Bank is a hamlet in Cumbria, England.

References

Hamlets in Cumbria
South Lakeland District